'hunting strategy, or hunting method''', is a tactic that is used to target, pursue, and hunt an animal. The hunting strategy that a hunter uses depends mainly on the type of terrain, as well as game being hunted. Climate, local hunting techniques, and local hunting laws are also taken in consideration. Some of the most common hunting methods that are used include: still hunting, stalking, driving, stand hunting, calling, baiting, hunting with dogs and falconry.

Still hunting 
Still hunting is a common method of hunting used to hunt North American big game species such as deer, elk, bear, and feral hogs. Still hunting is the process of hunting an animal by sneaking into habitats where the animal lives and trying to spot the animal before the animal spots you. The process emulates the final procedure of spot and stalk hunting throughout throughout the entire process.  The still hunting method of hunting is not the most popular hunting technique because it takes a fair amount of skill and time. Still hunting is an ancient method of hunting that was used by our ancestors to hunt and kill animals to eat. Still hunting is done by tracking animals down by looking for their tracks, droppings, mating signs, etc. and following this sign very carefully. When following the animal sign it is important to walk very slowly and very quietly while constantly scanning for movement and wildlife. It is also important to stop frequently to watch and listen for wildlife around you. Wind direction is another important aspect of still hunting because if the wind is blowing in the direction that you are walking, it is likely that the animal that you are hunting will smell you and scurry before you ever come into contact with the animal.

Stalking 
Though staking and still-hunting may resemble in many ways, while the still hunter follows game through its haunts following tracks, stalking, or spot and stalk hunting, consists in locating game from afar and trying to approach within shooting distance, taking advantage of the territory's geography, forest, wind direction and sun location, thus, avoiding to be detected through sight, sounds and smells. Stalk hunting is mainly practiced in mountain terrain, inhabited by animals with low tolerance for human presence, such as sheep, goats, and several mountain deer species. In order to be successful, the hunter gets advantage from vantage points from where to spot game in open ground, that provides less concealment than forested areas.

Pushing 
This strategy is widely used to hunt elusive game in heavy covered areas. It is probably one of the first methods of hunting used by primitive tribes, and even used by animals, such as African lions, where male lions show themselves with aid of their smell and roar to spook antelope towards the position where the more agile lioness is concealed. Humans also use the same principle; pushing game out of forest towards a hunter ready to take a shot.

Stand hunting 
Stand hunting is likely the most common form of hunting used today when hunting for most North American big game species, especially in the east. Stand hunting is when the hunter is stationary in one location and waits for the animal to come to them. Hunters often use tree-stands, ground blinds, and tripod stands to make the hunt more comfortable and to make it harder for the wildlife to spot them. The locations where hunters chose to stand hunt varies greatly. Often hunters will set up a stand near a food source that their target animal species is coming to for food. Hunters will also stand hunt along game trails, and even near water sources in drier climates. The stand hunting method is also the fundamental method used when using baiting, and often calling hunting methods.

Calling 
The technique of calling can be a very effective hunting technique. Calling is the process of using game calls or some other instrument to replicate the sounds of the animal that you are hunting. Game calls are especially effective during the desired species' mating season. During this time, animal mating calls can be a sure fire way to lure in an animal that is within earshot of you. The most common calls used when hunting deer are grunt calls, bleat calls, and rattling antlers. The grunt call can be aggressive buck grunts that would attract a buck that is looking to display his dominance, while bleat calls mimic the sound of a doe that is looking for a buck to breed her. Rattling antlers imitate the sound of two bucks fighting and can lure other bucks in to see what the commotion is all about.

Baiting 
While baiting is an extremely popular and very effective way to encounter various species of wildlife, it is important to check local game laws to ensure that baiting is legal in the area. While most places allow baiting, some areas still deem it illegal to bait wildlife. Baiting is pretty simple and is just the act of using an artificial food source that is placed near your hunting stand to attract the species of animal that is being pursued. Some common baits that are used to attract big game in North America are things such as dried field corn, apples, salt, minerals, and even processed foods such as peanut butter and molasses.

Hunting strategies include:

Baiting is the use of decoys, lures, scent or food to attract targeted animals.
Blind or Stand hunting is waiting for animals in a concealed or elevated position.
Calling is the use of noises to attract or drive animals.
Camouflage is concealing oneself visually, or with scent, to blend in with the environment.
Dogs may be used to help flush, herd, drive, track, point at, pursue, or retrieve animals.
Game drive system was a prehistoric hunting strategy where game were herded into areas where they could be hunted in groups.
Driving is the herding of animals in a particular direction, as over a cliff or to other hunters.
Flushing is the practice of scaring targets from concealed areas.
Spotlighting is the use of artificial light to find or blind targets before capture. Modern lighting also includes IR and other devices.
Scouting consists of a variety of tasks and techniques for finding animals to hunt.
Stalking is the practice of walking stealthily, often in pursuit of an identified animal.
Tracking is the practice of interpreting physical evidence to pursue animals.
Trapping is the use of devices (e.g., snares, pits, deadfalls) to capture or kill an animal.

References

Hunting
Law enforcement techniques